The Federal Boiler Inspection Act, also called the Railroad Inspection Act,  expanded the Boiler Inspection Act of 1911 to include federal interstate commerce clause regulation not just of train engine boilers, but of the entire train as well as cargo to ensure safety for workers and passengers. In 1915 the Boiler Inspection Act was expanded and retitled to the Locomotive Inspection Act.

Notes

External links 
 Trainnet libraries
 National Archives

United States federal transportation legislation